Shuzhou was a Chinese zhou (prefecture) in Anhui Province. It was located roughly where modern Anqing now lies.

Governors and prefects of Shuzhou in the Tang dynasty include Zhang Zhenzhou, Lü Yongzhi, Li Sujie and Gao Yu (高澞, grandnephew of Gao Pian, 高駢)

References

Prefectures of the Tang dynasty
Prefectures of Yang Wu
Prefectures of Southern Tang
Prefectures of Later Zhou
Prefectures of the Song dynasty
Anqing
Former prefectures in Anhui